The Monte Astu massif is a chain of mountains in the northeast of the island of Corsica, France.
It takes its name from Monte Astu, the highest peak.

Location

The Monte Astu massif has a main chain, the Serra di Tenda, and two secondary chains.
The Serra di Tenda has all the highest peaks in the massif.
It separates the Nebbio from the Ostriconi valley.

Part of the massif covering  has been designated a Zone naturelle d'intérêt écologique, faunistique et floristique (ZNIEFF).
The ZNIEFF extends along the ridge from Monte Filetto (842 m) to the Rocher de Pietrapolo (1104 m). 
This main chain changes direction at Monte Tassu, where a secondary ridge line oriented to the north emerges, comprising Monte Maggiore (1102 m) and Monte Pietrapolo (1104 m). 
The main ridge line has eight peaks that exceed 1,100 m: Cima di Grimaseta: , Monte Asto: , Cima to i Muzzelli: , Punta di Paganella: , Monte Reghia di Pozzo: , Monte Sant'Angelo: , Monte Tassu: , Rocher de Pietrapolo: .

Peaks

The main peaks are,

Hydrography
The western part of the Monte Astu massif is drained to the north by the Aliso which flows into the Gulf of Saint-Florent and to the south by the Ostriconi. The streams from the eastern sector flow either into the Bevinco (to the north) or into the Golo (to the south).

Gallery

Notes

Sources

Mountains of Haute-Corse
Massifs of Corsica